Kaiyuan Za Bao, or Kaiyuan Chao Bao, Bulletin of the Court, was an official publication which first appeared in the 8th century, during the Kaiyuan era. It has been described as the first Chinese newspaper or official gazette, and also as the world's first magazine. Its main subscribers were imperial officials. Every day the political news and domestic news were collected by the editors, and the writers transcribed it to send to the provinces. It was hand printed on silk, and appeared between 713 and 734.

See also 

 Tipao
 Peking Gazette
 List of the earliest newspapers

References

Tang dynasty literature
Mass media in Xi'an
History of Xi'an
713 establishments
734 disestablishments